Býkovice is a municipality and village in Blansko District in the South Moravian Region of the Czech Republic. It has about 200 inhabitants.

History
The first written mention of Býkovice is from 1264.

References

Villages in Blansko District